The 1874 Kidderminster by-election was fought on 31 July 1874.  The byelection was fought due to the void Election of the incumbent Conservative MP, Albert Grant.  It was won by the Conservative candidate Sir William Fraser.

References

1874 in England
Kidderminster
1874 elections in the United Kingdom
By-elections to the Parliament of the United Kingdom in Worcestershire constituencies